The Drug Resistance Strategies Project (DRS), a program funded by the National Institute on Drug Abuse (NIDA), teaches adolescents and pre-adolescents how to make decisions and resist alcohol, tobacco, and other drugs (ATOD).

The DRS project was one of the first programs to examine how adolescents refused offers of substances. Adolescent narratives revealed for resistance strategies—Refuse, Explain, Avoid, and Leave that became known as the REAL strategies. These narratives became the basis for a multicultural school-based substance use prevention program, keepin’ it REAL (kiR). To reduce the likelihood that youth will engage in ATOD, the kiR lessons include personal stories and language that youth find familiar, along with teaching effective risk assessment, decision making, communication, and life skills including the REAL strategies. Middle and elementary schools are currently implementing kiR in the following states: Arizona, Delaware, Indiana, Maryland, Michigan, Ohio, Pennsylvania, and Tennessee. In 2006, the Substance Abuse and Mental Health Services Administration's National Registry of Evidence-based Programs and Practices selected kiR as a “Model Program” for its culturally grounded substance use prevention curriculum.

History
In the 1980s, Drs. Michelle Miller-Day and Michael Hecht’s research in interpersonal and interethnic communication at Arizona State University led them to use narrative and performance theories to study how people's personal stories promote reading, prevent date rape, and develop positive familial attitudes. They first obtained funding from NIDA and launched the Project (DRS1) in 1989. Initial research  was conducted in two high schools in Arizona. With this work, Miller-Day and Hecht identified the four resistance strategies (Refuse, Avoid, Explain, and Leave) that are the core of the DRS Project. Since then the project expanded to include middle and elementary school students and to address ethnicity and gender.

In 1997, Hecht moved to the Pennsylvania State University where he continued the Drug Resistance Strategies Project in collaboration with colleagues from Arizona. The project developed, implemented, and evaluated a middle school prevention curriculum. More specifically, Hecht and his colleagues created keepin’ it REAL and field tested the curriculum, which they later implemented in thirty five middle schools in Phoenix. KiR was successful in limiting use of alcohol, tobacco, and marijuana between 7th and 8th grades.

Starting in 2003, they have been working under a new grant from the National Institute on Drug Abuse. The current research concentrates on determining the best grade level to introduce the prevention program (5th vs. 7th grade), including elementary school implementation in addition to middle school. In addition, work on DRS4 continues the long-term study examining the relationships among acculturation, decision-making, different types of norms, identity, family structure, parent-child communication, and drug use.

In 2012, Dr. Michelle Miller-Day moved to Chapman University where she continues to work closely with Pennsylvania State University on the Drug Resistance Strategies Project.

Results
The findings from this project are in numerous journals of health, prevention science, communication, and social work. The publications contain all aspects covered by the project; some of them being the principle of cultural grounding in school-based substance use prevention seen in the Journal of Language and Social Psychology and promoting reduced and discontinued substances among adolescent substance users, seen in the Prevention Science. Some of the work done on culture can be seen through the publication on ethnicity vs. ethnic identity in assessing what predicts substance use, norms, and behaviors, and a study of and acculturation status substance use prevention with Mexican and Mexican American youth, both seen in the Journal of Social Work Practice in the Addictions.

The use of tobacco, alcohol, and marijuana was compared using a self-reported quantity of frequency of use before the program and at two, eight, and fourteen months after students completed the curriculum. Participants in the program reported a lower use of the three substances than the students who did not receive the program. Effects lasted for up to 14 months for alcohol and marijuana use and up to 8 months for cigarettes. Other analysis show that the program works on adolescents who have started using substances before keepin’ it REAL as well as those who have not.

Anti-substance attitudes were also found to be effected by the program.  At the 8 and 14-month follow-ups, the program participants reported lower expectations of positive consequences of substance use compared with students who did not receive the intervention. Although the intervention had no effect on perceptions of parental or peer norms, students who received the program curriculum reported lower personal acceptance of drug use for up to eight months after the intervention. When compared to the control students, students who received the Mexican American version of the curriculum reported smaller increases in estimates of the number of their friends who used drugs.

References
 Alberts, J.K., Miller-Rassulo, & Hecht, M.L. (1991). A typology of drug resistance strategies. Journal of Applied Communication Research, 19, 129-151.
 Alberts, J.K., Hecht, M.L., Miller-Rassulo, M., & Krizek, R.L. (1992). The communicative process of drug resistance among high school students. Adolescence, 27, 203-226.
 Gosin, M., Marsiglia, F.F., & Hecht, M.L. (2003) Keepin’ it REAL: A drug resistance curriculum tailored to the strengths and needs of pre-adolescents of the Southwest. The Journal of Drug Education, 33, 2, 119-142.
 Hecht, M.L., & Driscoll, G. (1994). A comparison of the communication, social, situational, and individual factors associated with alcohol and other drugs. International Journal of the Addictions, 29, 1225-1243.
 Hecht, M.L., Graham, J.W. & Elek, E. (2006). The Drug Resistance Strategies Intervention: Program Effects on Substance Use. Health Communication, 20, 267-276.
 Hecht, M.L., & Johnson, A. (2005). keepin’ it R.E.A.L.: A Culturally Grounded Substance Abuse Prevention Curriculum. Behavioral Health Management, 25, 45-48.

External links
Official Website
An intervention summary of keepin’ it REAL can be found on SAMHSA’s National Registry of Evidence-based Programs and Practices

Drug control law in the United States
Health education in the United States
National Institutes of Health